Love in Limbo (released in the Philippines as Touch Me, Kiss Me, Love Me) is a 1993 Australian romantic comedy film directed and produced by David Elfick. The film stars Craig Adams, Aden Young and Russell Crowe. The film was released on 20 May 1993. Visually the film was heavily influenced by The Girl Can't Help It (1956). It was nominated for three awards by the Australian Film Institute in 1992.

Plot

Cast
Craig Adams as Ken Riddle
Rhondda Findleton as Gwen Riddle
Martin Sacks as Max Wiseman
Aden Young as Barry McJannet
Russell Crowe as Arthur Baskin
Maya Stange as Ivy Riddle
Samantha Murray as Maisie
Bill Young as Uncle Herbert
Leith Taylor as Mrs. Rutherford
Jill Perryman as Aunt Dorry
Robert van Mackelenberg as Headmaster
Peter De Bari as Schoolboy
Arianthe Galani as Mrs. Costanides
Faye Metaxas as Mrs. Laventis
Igor Sas as Maurice Hosking

Release
Love in Limbo was released in Australia on 20 May 1993. In the Philippines, the film was released as Touch Me, Kiss Me, Love Me in November 1995.

Critical response
Rob Lowing, film critic for the Sydney Morning Herald rated the film two stars out of four. Lowing described the film as "unatmospheric but well-produced" and "laced with distressingly puerile Porky's-like humour". For Cinema Papers, Karl Quinn wrote, "To note that David Elfick's Love In Limbo is a beautifully-designed film is to point to both its greatest strength and its great weakness, for it is surely one of the best recent examples of the triumph of style over substance".

Margaret Pomeranz and David Stratton for SBS TV's The Movie Show both rated the film three stars out of five. In her review Pomeranz concluded, "Love in Limbo may not be ultimately, totally satisfying but it certainly has its share of entertaining moments". Stratton praised the production design, adding, "The acknowledgement to movies of the 50s is very clear here and very well done".

See also
Cinema of Australia
Russell Crowe filmography

References

External links

1993 films
1993 independent films
1993 romantic comedy films
1990s coming-of-age comedy films
1990s teen comedy films
Australian coming-of-age comedy films
Australian independent films
Australian romantic comedy films
Australian teen comedy films
Coming-of-age romance films
Films set in the 1950s
Films shot in Perth, Western Australia
1990s English-language films
1990s Australian films